The 2011 Big League World Series of baseball took place from July 27 - August 3 in Easley, South Carolina, United States. Taylors,  South Carolina defeated San Juan,  Puerto Rico in the championship game.

Teams

Results

United States Group

International Group

Elimination Round

References

Big League World Series
Big League World Series
Big League World Series